Ignacio 'Nacho' Díaz Casanova Montenegro (born 4 February 1986 in Las Palmas, Canary Islands) is a Spanish footballer who plays as a forward.

Honours
Pasching
Austrian Cup: 2012–13

References

External links

1986 births
Living people
Spanish footballers
Footballers from Las Palmas
Association football forwards
Segunda División players
Segunda División B players
Tercera División players
UD Las Palmas Atlético players
UD Las Palmas players
Águilas CF players
RCD Mallorca B players
Alicante CF footballers
Austrian Football Bundesliga players
2. Liga (Austria) players
SV Ried players
FC Juniors OÖ players
SV Horn players
Spanish expatriate footballers
Expatriate footballers in Austria
Spanish expatriate sportspeople in Austria